Andre Sayegh (born 1974) is an American politician who has served since 2018 as the Mayor of Paterson, the third-most populous city in New Jersey. Prior to being elected as Mayor, Sayegh served on the Paterson City Council from 2008 until 2018.

Biography 
Sayegh was born in Paterson, the son of a Syrian mother and a Lebanese father. A practicing Roman Catholic, he was raised in the Lakeview neighborhood of Paterson. Sayegh graduated from DePaul Catholic High School in 1992. He graduated from Seton Hall University with a B.A. in History; and then earned a M.A. in Public Policy and Administration from Columbia University. Sayegh began his public service by serving on the Paterson school board and then in 2008, as a city councilman representing the 6th Ward. In 2014, he ran for mayor of Paterson but was defeated by Jose Torres. In the 2018 mayoral election, running on a coalition of various groups including Christian and Muslim Arabs; African-Americans; Peruvians, and Latinos, he successfully ran for mayor. On May 8, 2018, he was sworn in as Mayor of Paterson succeeding Jane Williams-Warren.

In 2018, Sayegh was selected as one of 40 mayors to participate in the Bloomberg-Harvard City Leadership program. This year-long education and professional development program was designed for mayors to help deliver results to residents.  He had the opportunity to learn from other mayors from cities such as Miami, Atlanta, Seattle, Quito, and Reykjavik. As a result of the program, Paterson hired a new Chief Innovation Officer and Chief Data Officer, funded by the Taub Foundation. Sayegh identified best practices from his fellow mayors and launched the Financial Empowerment Center and Mayors for a Guaranteed Income.  In Jan 2022, Bloomberg Philanthropies announced Paterson as one of 15 winning cities of the 2021-2022 Global Mayors Challenge, a worldwide innovation competition. Paterson's RealFix was awarded one million dollars in addition to technical support and coaching over three years.

One of the first grants secured during the Sayegh administration was Paterson’s entry into a 2019 national campaign to expand access to parks across the city. 72% of Paterson residents live within a 10-minute walk of a park, a number this administration seeks to increase to 100% within five years.  This grant helped create the current vision plan.

Getting a complete and accurate count for the Census was a major initiative in the Sayegh administration in 2020. This required creating a "Complete Count Committee" coalescing all the demographics groups in the city to fill out the Census survey. The census determined that Paterson had surpassed 150,000 residents, earning the designation of first-class city for the first time.  A first class city receives additional grant funding and resources.

, Paterson is receiving an investment through $139 million in state tax credits. The Sayegh administration identified several transformative projects such as reviving Hinchliffe Stadium, one of only two ballparks still standing that hosted Negro league baseball games. The funding also supported an affordable housing initiative for senior citizens entitled "Grandparents Raising Grandchildren" will provide 76 units for this vulnerable population. To enhance the appeal of the Great Falls, in cooperation with the Hamilton Partnership for Paterson and Devco, a visitors center named for Paterson's founder, Alexander Hamilton, is under construction with support of the grant.

Recent work includes managing the impact of the COVID-19 pandemic while simultaneously driving economic development. Sayegh mobilized city resources to drive COVID-19 testing, provide PPE to essential front-line workers.  The City of Paterson earned national recognition for its successful contact tracing program.

On June 11th, 2022 a Paterson Police officer, Jerry Moravek, shot an unarmed 28-year-old Khalif Cooper in the back. Andre Sayegh came out in support of the officer and made a statement that that several guns and shell casings were found at the scene. This statement was also backed up further by Passaic County authorities that said Khalif Cooper had a gun. The Attorney General’s Office came out and refuted that claim and showed that Khalif Cooper was unarmed. Attorney General Matt Platkin announced that Jerry Moravek has been charged with assault after reviewing statements and body-worn camera footage.

Jameek Lowery Case 
Sayegh faced protests after the death of Jameek Lowery following a police interaction. He claimed Lowery had bacterial meningitis. Lowery's mother Patrice King took offense at Sayegh's claim that her son had meningitis. She confronted Sayegh at a City Council meeting.

“All that meningitis bull crap is not going to stop us,” King said. Sayegh launched an audit of the police department and promised to equip police officers with by cameras to placate the family and the African American community after Lowery's death. Sayegh was slow to equip officers with body cameras. His slowness cost Paterson taxpayers $44,000.He was also slow with the police audit. Mother of Lowery's son sued the City of Paterson claiming police officers 'choked' Lowery to death inside the ambulance.

Sayegh's handling of the Lowery case was slammed by his opponents on the City Council.

Personal life
Sayegh speaks Arabic. He is married to Farhanna Sayegh and has two daughters and a son.

References

1970s births
Living people
Mayors of Paterson, New Jersey
American politicians of Lebanese descent
American politicians of Syrian descent
Catholics from New Jersey
Columbia University alumni
DePaul Catholic High School alumni
Seton Hall University alumni